Haki Xhakli is a Kosovo Albanian painter and a university professor from Kosovo. He is known for his composition paintings where figures of horse, castle and woman dominate.

Life 

Haki Xhakli was born on 3 October 1952 in Ferizaj, where he attended his early education. In 1978 he graduated from the Academy of Figurative Arts in University of Prishtina, where he studied painting in the class of professor Rexhep Ferri.

From 1982 to 1988 he was leading the Artist's Association Zef Kolombi in Ferizaj. Since 1984 he has been a member of the Association of Figurative Artists of Kosovo, which he chaired from 2006 to 2008.

He has been working at the Faculty of Education since 2005, where he teaches art methodology to undergraduates and graduates, with the title of Professor Assistant at the University of Prishtina. In 2010 he received a Doctoral Degree on Social Sciences at University of Skopje. In 2016 he served temporarily as the Dean of Faculty of Education at University of Prishtina. Xhakli was also a national coordinator for curriculum development of art education in Kosovo organised by Ministry of Education, Science and Technology (Kosovo) from 2002 until 2012.

Exhibitions 
Xhakli participated in several international collective exhibitions and opened personal ones in Kosovo, Italy, Germany, France, Netherlands, Serbia, Macedonia and Albania.

In Kosovo, he had ten solo exhibitions and participated in forty four (44) collective exhibitions.

 1983 Culture House, Ferizaj, Kosovo
 1993 Cafe Gallery “Kata”, Ferizaj, Kosovo
 1994 Cafe “Bolero”, Ferizaj, Kosovo
 1995 SHKA “Agimi”, Prizren, Kosovo
 1996 Gallery “Rada”, Prizren, Kosovo
 1999 Hellweg-Museum, Unna, Germany 
 1999 Katharinen-Hoff, Unna, Germany 
 2000 Art Gallery, Ferizaj, Kosovo
 2002 Culture House, Kaçanik, Kosovo
 2003 Gallery of Ministry of Culture, Prishtina, Kosovo
 2006 Gallery of Ministry of Culture, Prishtina, Kosovo
 2011 National History Museum, Tirana, Albania
 2014 Show Your Hope, Eindhoven, The Netherlands 
 2016 Embassy of Kosovo, Berlin, Germany 
 2020 Assembly of the Republic of Kosovo, Prishtina, Kosovo
 2022 National Theatre of Opera and Ballet of Albania, Tirana, Albania

During his career he spent time in Florence, Italy and Unna, Germany where he was a personal tutor of painters Ilona Hetmann  and Hans Wegener.

Gallery

Work 

The symbols that Haki Xhakli communicates in his paintings are universal and autochthonous. Universal to the fact, as they are transposed well into the fabric and very accessible to understand for the general public and indigenous to the author's region as each figure and every single painting line comes from the experience of daily lives to the bloodshed history of author's nation.

The inevitable symbol which is present in almost every painting of the artist is the horse. Its unique drawing brings up multiple associations with everyday life. It is portrayed as the symbol of faithfulness, but also of the burden that holds upon itself. It is very visible the inescapable feeling of alertness and vigilance that the horse symbol represents. With this detail, the artist reminds the audience for the struggles of the Albanian people for centuries, who could never sleep quietly, be comfortable and had to watch out on every side from dangers coming from conquerors nearby claiming the domination over the soil of artist's nation.

In line with the horse symbol and its head, there is the symbol of the castle that connects well with high rooftops and small turrets, this symbolises the national resistance and the never-ending danger from various occupants. Its shielded walls used as a protection from enemies indicates the coldness of the stones absorbing from outside and the warmth inside that is offered through hospitality to every friend.

The last piece of the triangle on his painting symbols is the personality of the woman, described as the symbol of human renewal. Painted as pretty, with a focus on the eyes, his paintings give a precise perspective thought where woman's sacrifice to save humankind is visible. In the woman's eyes in the paintings, you can read numerous stories, blunders, desires, goals, even tragedies, and troubles. The woman in Xhakli's paintings never spared herself, regardless of circumstances, and regardless of the absurd situations in which she was. The artist presents her entire spiritual world as it is, extremely grandiose and unobstructed, on one side and very modest on the other side.

Through many symbols, he empowers his painting by elevating it to a high degree of universal semiotics, which receives a polysemic message, which then is not difficult to be accepted by artisans regardless of the relevance. One particular painting cycle that Xhakli created is the Apocalypse, as it makes the viewer think that it is the end of the world, in fact, it is portrayed as the end of the dreadful side of the universe.

Publications

References

Living people
1952 births
Kosovo Albanians
Kosovan painters
Modern painters
20th-century painters
21st-century painters
People from Ferizaj